The St. Basil of Ostrog Monastery is a Serbian Orthodox monastery dedicated to Saint Basil of Ostrog located in the village of Crnogorci near the town of Imotski in Dalmatia, Croatia. The construction of the monastery began in 2005, and it had been suspended in 2006 after protests from the municipality of Podbablje.

See also 
List of Serb Orthodox monasteries
Serbs in Croatia

References 

Serbian Orthodox monasteries in Croatia
Buildings and structures in Split-Dalmatia County